Overdrawn at the Memory Bank is a 1984 science fiction television film, starring Raul Julia and Linda Griffiths. Based on the 1976 John Varley short story by the same name, the film takes place in a dystopian future where an employee for a conglomerate gets trapped inside the company's computer and ends up affecting the real world. It was co-produced by Canada's RSL Productions in Toronto and New York television station WNET. Because of its expensive budget the film was shot on videotape and pre-sold to small American cable companies.

It premiered on the CBC in 1984 and was later broadcast on American Playhouse in 1985. The film received mixed reception from critics. Overdrawn at the Memory Bank was featured in the eighth-season finale episode of the comedy television series Mystery Science Theater 3000 in 1997.

Plot
In a future dystopia, Aram Fingal, a programmer working for conglomerate Novicorp, is caught watching Casablanca at his workstation. To rehabilitate him, the company assigns him mandatory prophylactic rehab, where subjects are "doppeled" into wild animals to experience relaxation. Aram is sent into a baboon and is monitored by controller Apollonia James. Aram begins to enjoy his existence until he is threatened by an elephant shaking the tree he is perched on. He activates an escape clause that is supposed to return his mind to his original body. However, during his doppel preparation, a tour of young students had visited the transfer center and one student switched the routing tag on Aram's body. Due to the tag swap, no one can locate his body. Aram's mind must be kept active by storing it in Novicorp's central computer – the HX368 which controls everything from finances to the weather. His mind can only be maintained in such a way for a limited time before it is destroyed.

Aram's disappearance is reported to a rival corporation. The news is broadcast worldwide, causing Novicorp's share price to crash. Majority shareholders force Novicorp's Chairman to divert resources to keep Aram alive and find his body. Apollonia is assigned to locate and keep him from hacking into Novicorp's mainframe. With Apollonia's help, Aram creates a virtual world where he encounters characters from Casablanca, including a version of Humphrey Bogart's character, Rick. Aram quickly grows bored, eventually plotting to bring down Novicorp's finances without being removed and killed. Apollonia tries to keep him out of trouble, placing herself in opposition to Novicorp's leaders, eventually finding herself falling in love with Aram and develops a conflict of interest.

With Apollonia's help, Aram eventually "interfaces" with the mainframe and defeats his antagonists. He also returns to his body, which has been discovered before undergoing a sex change operation. Finally corporeal and reunited with his accomplice, Aram has taken complete control of the HX368. After ordering bonuses and stocks for every employee, committing Novicorp's Chairman to a month of "compulsory rehab" via doppeling and changing both his and Apollonia's identity to those of Rick and Ilsa from Casablanca, Aram vows to fight against the dystopian government. The film ends with the new couple walking out the door and, now free from Novicorp's oppression, talking about opening a club on the other side of town: Rick's Place.

Cast

 Raul Julia as Aram Fingal/Rick Blaine
 Linda Griffiths as Apollonia James
 Donald C. Moore as Novicorp Chairman/The Fat Man 
 Wanda Cannon as Felicia Varley/Lola
 Helen Carscallen as Dr. Darwin
 Chapelle Jaffe as Djamilla
 Gary Farmer as Tooby
 Louis Negin as Pierre
 Maury Chaykin as Gondol

Production and release
Based on the 1976 John Varley short story by the same name, Overdrawn at the Memory Bank was co-produced by New York television station WNET and Toronto-based production company RSL Films, Ltd. It was shot between August 20 to September 12, 1983. Co-producer Robert Lantos said that the film's budget "exceeded well into seven figures". To alleviate the costs, it was pre-sold to small American cable companies. The film was shot on videotape, with Lantos claiming that if it was shot on photographic film, it would have been as expensive as Blade Runner. It was directed by Douglas Williams with the film treatment written by Corinne Jacker.

The film premiered on the CBC on September 22, 1984. It was later shown on PBSs anthology series American Playhouse on February 4, 1985. It was released on VHS by New World Video and LaserDisc by Image Entertainment.

Reception
Tom Brinkmoeller for The Cincinnati Enquirer called Overdrawn at the Memory Bank a "tongue-in-cheek and imaginative 90-minute delight". LA Weekly, acknowledging the low production values, gave praise for its ideas and the strong romantic relationship between Julia's and Griffiths' characters. The Washington Posts Sandy Rovner described the film as "certainly inoffensive, occasionally funny and altogether watchable". Jim Murphy from The Age considered the plot to be "quite torturous" but thought it to be imaginative enough to sustain interest. In his book The Sci-Fi Movie Guide, Chris Barsanti assessed Overdrawn at the Memory Bank as being one of the better film translations of cyberpunk, while also being one of the least known. Barsanti also called the film a "fun lark" despite its confusing ending. In a negative review by Bruce Malloch for Cinema Canada, he remarked that if it was a feature film rather than on TV, it would be a failure. Malloch was critical of its plot and special effects, and its attempts to balance both drama and comedy.

Mystery Science Theater 3000
Overdrawn at the Memory Bank was featured in the eighth-season finale episode of Mystery Science Theater 3000 (MST3K), a comedy television series in which the character Mike Nelson and his two robot friends Crow T. Robot and Tom Servo are forced to watch bad films as part of an ongoing scientific experiment. The episode was broadcast on the Sci-Fi Channel on December 6, 1997. MST3K cast member Bill Corbett disliked the film, calling it an "extraordinarily dumb movie whose relentless 'funny' techno-futuro-jargon was the screenwriting equivalent of water torture." Corbett also noted difficulties in mocking the film due to the death of Raul Julia, resulting in them barely making riffs on the actor. Paul Chaplin voiced his hatred towards Overdrawn, equating his disdain with later "experiment" Hobgoblins. PBS and its pledge drives were also satirized throughout this episode.

The episode was considered one of the best episodes in the series, both by critics and by fans of the show. Jim Vorel for Paste ranked it as the 40th best in the entire series, saying the film was ahead of its time and gave praise for the acting. Vorel was irritated by its soft focus appearance but overall considered it to be one of the most interesting films featured on the show. A fan poll for the top 100 best episodes in the series voted it as eleventh. Elliott Kalan, the head writer for the Netflix era of the series, placed it as one of his favorite episodes in the series. In 2003, Rhino Entertainment released the MST3K episode as part of the "Volume 4" DVD collection, along with episodes focused on Girl in Gold Boots, Hamlet, and Space Mutiny.
It was soon re-released by Shout Factory in 2017.

References 

Notes

Citations

Bibliography

Further reading

External links 
 
 

1984 films
1984 television films
Films based on short fiction
Films set in the future
Dystopian films
American science fiction television films
Canadian science fiction television films
Films about telepresence
Alliance Atlantis films
American Playhouse
New World Pictures films
English-language Canadian films
1980s American films
1980s Canadian films